Storyman is an album by the bluegrass mandolin player Sam Bush released by Sugar Hill Records on June 24, 2016. The album release show was in Nashville, Tennessee at the City Winery on July 23, 2016.

"Carcinoma Blues" was written by Guy Clark and Sam Bush. "Hand Mics Killed Country Music" features Bush and Emmylou Harris. Bush and Harris co-wrote the song.
"Transcendental Meditation Blues" was co-written with long time collaborator Jeff Black.

Track listing

Personnel
 Sam Bush - vocals, guitar, mandolin, fiddle
 Stephen Mougin - vocals, guitar
 Todd Parks - vocals, electric bass
 Scott Vestal - banjo
 Chris Brown - drums

References

2016 albums
Sam Bush albums
Sugar Hill Records albums